Mandalay is a 1934 American pre Code drama film directed by Michael Curtiz and written by Austin Parker and Charles Kenyon based on a story by Paul Hervey Fox. The film stars Kay Francis, Ricardo Cortez, Warner Oland and Lyle Talbot, and features Ruth Donnelly and Reginald Owen.

The film is about a world-weary woman (Francis) nicknamed "Spot White" at the local brothel-bar who does what she can to survive. Curtiz used cutting edge wipes and opticals in the film. Future child star Shirley Temple won a small role in the film as the daughter of the Donnelly and Littlefield characters, but the role was little more than a walk-on. Originally, her name was not listed in the credits and was only included years later.

Plot summary
Russian refugee Tanya Borisoff is suddenly abandoned penniless in Rangoon, Burma, by her lover, Tony Evans, who accepted a gunrunning deal from Nick, the owner of an amoral nightclub. Nick made the deal hoping to get Tanya as his main "hostess," which Tanya accepts after an initial refusal, just to make the best of a bad situation. She becomes notorious using the name "Spot White," but her affairs cause the commissioner of police to deport her. She reminds the commissioner of a previous tryst he had with her and extorts 10,000 rupees from him with which to make a new life. She uses a new name, Marjorie Lang, going to Mandalay, Burma, via the Irrawadi River by steamer, where she meets alcoholic Dr. Gregory Burton, who is on his way to help in an area plagued with a deadly contagious fever. As they slowly fall in love, she learns he's doing that to make amends for once operating on a patient while drunk, causing his death. She decides to go with him so they can put their pasts behind them together. But Tony is on the steamer too, and tries to convince Tanya he still loves her. Tony gets a wire from Nick telling him the police are on his trail and will pick him up at the next port, so he leaves evidence to suggest he took poison and jumped overboard, but actually he hides in the hold of the boat. The captain finds the evidence and believes Tanya murdered Tony, but at the urging of Dr. Burton and the first mate who finds the wire, he finally decides it was a suicide and frees her. When Tony returns to an astonished Tanya, he tries to convince her to open a club with him in Mandalay, where she could be a "hostess" again. Through with that life, she eyes the poison still in the cabin as Tony asks her to make him a drink.

Cast
 Kay Francis as Tanya Borodoff
 Ricardo Cortez as Tony Evans
 Warner Oland as Nick
 Lyle Talbot as Dr. Gregory Burton
 Lucien Littlefield as George Peters
 Ruth Donnelly as Mrs. George Peters
 Reginald Owen as Police Commissioner
 Shirley Temple as Betty Shaw (scenes deleted)

Production
The lead roles were initially offered to George Brent and his wife Ruth Chatterton. Chatterton turned down the role because she did not want to play a prostitute again, and Brent because he did not want to make the trip to the Stockton, California location on San Joaquin River, where the film shot for 10 days. Afterwards, Ricardo Cortez was assigned by the studio to play "Tony Evans".

Reception
Although the critics did not see the film as anything better than a good "B-movie", it was well-received and was a moneymaker for the studio.

Box office
According to Warner Bros records the film made a profit of $83,462.

References

Bibliography

External links
 
 
 
 

1934 films
1934 drama films
American drama films
American black-and-white films
1930s English-language films
Films about prostitution in Myanmar
Films directed by Michael Curtiz
Films scored by Heinz Roemheld
Films set in Myanmar
Warner Bros. films
First National Pictures films
1930s American films